ACM Transactions on Multimedia Computing, Communications, and Applications (TOMM) is a quarterly scientific journal that aims to disseminate the latest findings of note in the field of multimedia computing. It is published by the Association for Computing Machinery. In May 2014 the acronym has changed from TOMMCAP to TOMM.

The editor-in-chief is Abdulmotaleb El Saddik (Mohamed bin Zayed University of Artificial Intelligence). According to the Journal Citation Reports, the journal had a 2020 impact factor of 3.144.

See also
 Association for Computing Machinery
 SIGMM

References

External links
 
 ACM SIG MultiMedia website

Computer science journals
Transactions on Multimedia Computing, Communications, and Applications
Publications established in 2005
Quarterly journals